By Request may refer to:

 By Request (Boyzone album), 1999
 By Request (Brenda Lee album), 1964
 By Request (Ernest Tubb album), 1966
 By Request (George Jones album), 1984
 By Request (Perry Como album), 1962
 By Request, 1975 album by Walter Carlos
 By Request, a 1928 romance novel by Ethel M. Dell